Saturnalia is an extinct genus of basal sauropodomorph dinosaur known from the Late Triassic Santa Maria Formation of Rio Grande do Sul, southern Brazil.

Discovery and naming 

Saturnalia was originally named on the basis of three partial skeletons. The holotype, MCP 3844-PV, a well-preserved semi-articulated postcranial skeleton, was discovered in mid-summer at Sanga da Alemoa, Rio Grande do Sul, in Brazil, in the geopark of Paleorrota. The two paratypes are MCP 3845-PV, partial skeleton including natural cast of partial mandible with teeth and some postcranial remains, and MCP 3846-PV, partial skeleton including postcranial remains. All specimens were collected in the "Wald-Sanga" (also known as "Sanga do Mato") locality from the Alemoa Member of the Santa Maria Formation (Rosário do Sul Group), dating to the Carnian faunal stage of the early Late Triassic, about 228 million years ago. It is one of the oldest true dinosaurs yet found. A U→Pb (Uranium decay) dating found that the Santa Maria Formation dated around 233.23 million years ago, putting it 1.5 million years older than the Ischigualasto Formation, and making the two formations approximately equal as the earliest dinosaur localities.

Saturnalia was first named by Max C. Langer, Fernando Abdala, Martha Richter, Michael J. Benton in 1999 and the type species is Saturnalia tupiniquim. The generic name is derived from Saturnalia, Latin for "Carnival", in reference to the discovery of the paratypes during the feasting period. The specific name is derived from Portuguese and Guarani word meaning native.

Classification 

The primitive nature of Saturnalia, combined with its mixture of sauropodomorph and theropod characteristics, has made it difficult to classify. Paleontologist Max Cardoso Langer and colleagues, in their 1999 description of the genus, assigned it to the Sauropodomorpha. However, in a 2003 paper, Langer noted that features of its skull and hand were more similar to the theropods, and that Saturnalia could at best be considered a member of the sauropodomorph "stem-lineage", rather than a true member of that group.

José Bonaparte and colleagues, in a 2007 study, found Saturnalia to be very similar to the primitive saurischian Guaibasaurus. Bonaparte placed the two in the same family, Guaibasauridae. Like Langer, Bonaparte found that these forms may have been primitive sauropodomorphs, or an assemblage of forms close to the common ancestor of the sauropodomorphs and theropods. Overall, Bonaparte found that both Saturnalia and Guaibasaurus were more theropod-like than prosauropod-like. However, all more recent cladistic analyses found it to be a very basal sauropodomorph, possibly guaibasaurid, as the family was found to nest in a basal position within Sauropodomorpha.

References

External links 

 
 
 Dinosaurs of Rio grande do Sul

Sauropodomorphs
Late Triassic dinosaurs of Africa
Fossils of Zimbabwe
Late Triassic dinosaurs of South America
Late Triassic sauropodomorphs
Sauropodomorphs of Africa
Sauropodomorphs of South America
Triassic Brazil
Fossils of Brazil
Paleontology in Rio Grande do Sul
Fossil taxa described in 1999
tupiniquim